WCHO-FM (105.5 FM) is a radio station broadcasting a country music format. The station is licensed to Washington Court House, Ohio, in the United States.  The station is owned by iHeartMedia, Inc., through licensee iHM Licenses, LLC, and features programming from ABC Radio and Premiere Radio Networks, as well as agriculture programming from the Agri Broadcast Network.

References

External links

CHO-FM
Radio stations established in 1968
1968 establishments in Ohio
IHeartMedia radio stations